Cleveland Clinic London is a 184-bed private hospital owned by the US operator Cleveland Clinic, opening in March 2022, and the second-largest of 19 private hospitals in the capital, after the Wellington Hospital in St John's Wood. It has partnered with the King Edward VII's Hospital.

Cleveland Clinic London is at 33 Grosvenor Place, and overlooks the gardens of Buckingham Palace.

References

External links
 

Hospitals in London
Buildings and structures in the City of Westminster
Private hospitals in the United Kingdom
Organisations based in the City of Westminster
Cleveland Clinic
Hospitals established in 2022